Shingirai Katsvere (born 10 May 1997) is a Zimbabwe rugby union player, currently playing for the  in the 2022 Currie Cup First Division. His preferred position is centre, wing or fullback.

Professional career
Katsvere represented Zimbabwe Academy in the 2019 Rugby Challenge. He was then named in the  squad for the 2022 Currie Cup First Division. Katsvere is a Zimbabwean international in both 15-a-side and sevens.

Katsvere competed for Zimbabwe at the 2022 Rugby World Cup Sevens in Cape Town.

References

External links
itsrugby.co.uk Profile

1997 births
Living people
Rugby union centres
Rugby union wings
Rugby union fullbacks
Zimbabwean rugby union players
Zimbabwe international rugby union players
Zimbabwe Academy rugby union players
Zimbabwe Goshawks players